Mansa District with headquarters at Mansa is a district located in Luapula Province. As of the 2000 Zambian Census, the district had a population of 179,749 people. It consists of two constituencies, namely Mansa Central and Bahati.

References

Districts of Luapula Province